Cherepanikha is a rural locality (a village) in Pogorelovskoye Rural Settlement, Totemsky District, Vologda Oblast, Russia. The population was 33 as of 2002.

Geography 
Cherepanikha is located 65 km southwest of Totma (the district's administrative centre) by road. Krasnoye is the nearest rural locality.

References 

Rural localities in Totemsky District